Taleh Jerd (also Romanized as Taleh Jerd; also known as Tahleh Cherd, Talaird, Talegerd, Taleh Gerd, and Tehla Sard) is a village in Golabar Rural District, in the Central District of Ijrud County, Zanjan Province, Iran. At the 2006 census, its population was 693, in 155 families.

References 

Populated places in Ijrud County